Eduard Wolpers (24 August 1900 – 23 November 1976) was a German international footballer.

References

External links 
 

1900 births
1976 deaths
Footballers from Hanover
Association football forwards
German footballers
Germany international footballers
Hamburger SV players
SV Arminia Hannover players